= The Daily Film Renter =

British film trade paper (1927–1957)

- Front cover of the 30 December, 1946 issue
- Categories: Film, TV
- Frequency: Daily / 3 times per week
- First issue: 10 January 1927; 99 years ago
- Final issue Number: 8 November 1957; 68 years ago 7505
- Company: Pictures and Pleasures Ltd (1927–1947); British & American Film Press Limited (1948–1957)
- Country: United Kingdom

The Daily Film Renter was a trade newspaper for the film production and exhibitor industries, published in the United Kingdom between 10 January 1927 and 8 November 1957. The paper contained news and opinion articles, film reviews, and trade advertisements.

== Overview ==
The Daily Film Renter was launched in 1927, titled Daily Film Renter & Moving Picture News. It was published as a Monday–Friday daily paper by Pictures and Pleasures Ltd (1927–1947) and then British & American Film Press Limited (1948–1957). In 1957 it was incorporated into The Daily Cinema, which itself subsequently became Today's Cinema (1969–1971), then Cinema TV Today (1971–1975), then merged with Screen International.

It was published daily except during World War II when it became 3 days a week. In the 1950s it incorporated TV into its coverage.

According to critic Harold Myers, London correspondent for Variety from 1947 to 1985, who worked for The Daily Film Renter in the 1930s, the paper's film reviews were sometimes less than impartial, according to who had bought advertising space in the paper.

== Archives ==
The paper's archives 1927–1957 (with the exception of 1949) are available via ProQuest.
